Plumgood Food was an online grocery store based in Nashville, Tennessee. It was founded in 2004 by Kate and Eric Satz and served Middle Tennessee and Kentucky. The company went out of business in late 2008.

See also
 Online shopping

References

External links
 Plumgood Food

Companies based in Nashville, Tennessee
Privately held companies based in Tennessee